Glenn Franklin Thistlethwaite (March 18, 1885 – October 6, 1956) was an American football, basketball, baseball, and track and field coach. He served as the head football coach at Illinois College (1908), Earlham College (1909–1912), Northwestern University (1922–1926), the University of Wisconsin–Madison (1927–1931), Carroll College—now known as Carroll University—in Waukesha, Wisconsin (1932–1933), and the University of Richmond (1934–1941), compiling a career college football record of 117–74–16. Coaching at Northwestern from 1922 to 1926, Thistlethwaite compiled a 21–17–1 record, making him one of the most successful coaches in Northwestern Wildcats football history. In 1926, his team won a share of the Big Ten Conference title, only the second in school history, and his tenure sparked a revival in Northwestern football after a post-World War I decline. From 1927 to 1931, Thistlethwaite coached at Wisconsin, tallying a 26–16–3 mark. From 1934 to 1941, he coached at Richmond, where he oversaw the school's entry into the Southern Conference in 1936. Born in Franklin, Indiana in 1885, Thistlethwaite died at the age of 71, on October 6, 1956, of a heart attack at a hospital in Richmond, Virginia.

Coaching career

Northwestern
Thistlethwaite was the 15th head football coach at Northwestern University  in Evanston, Illinois and held that position for five seasons, from 1922 until 1926. His record at Northwestern was 21–17–1.

Carroll
Thistlethwaite was the 17th head football coach at Carroll College—now known as Carroll University—in Waukesha, Wisconsin and held that position for two seasons, from 1932 until 1933. His record at Carroll College was 10–2–1.

Head coaching record

College football

References

External links
 

1885 births
1956 deaths
American football tackles
Basketball coaches from Indiana
Carroll Pioneers football coaches
Earlham Quakers baseball coaches
Earlham Quakers football coaches
Earlham Quakers football players
Earlham Quakers men's basketball coaches
Illinois College Blueboys football coaches
Northwestern Wildcats football coaches
Richmond Spiders athletic directors
Richmond Spiders football coaches
Wisconsin Badgers football coaches
College track and field coaches in the United States
High school football coaches in Illinois
People from Franklin, Indiana
Coaches of American football from Indiana
Players of American football from Indiana